This is a list of countries by fruit production in 2020 based on the Food and Agriculture Organization Corporate Statistical Database. The total world fruit  production for 2020 was 887,027,376 metric tonnes.

In 1961 production was 200 million tonnes.

Production by country 
The table shows the countries with the largest production of fruit (apricot, olive, pear, banana, mango, guava, coconut, fig, grapes, orange, papaya, peach, apple, pineapple, gooseberry, lemon, lime, raspberry, plum, strawberry, blueberry, kiwifruit, date, cherry, avocado, tomato, quince, watermelon).

World production

References 
		

Lists of countries by production
Fruit
Fruit